Kutuzovsky Prospekt is a major radial avenue in Moscow, Russia, named after Mikhail Illarionovich Kutuzov, leader of the Russian field army during the French invasion of Russia. The prospekt continues a westward path of Vozdvizhenka Street and New Arbat Street from Novoarbatsky Bridge over the Moskva River to the junction with Rublyovskoye Shosse; past this point, the route changes its name to Mozhaiskoye Shosse.

Overview
Present-day Kutuzovsky Prospekt emerged between 1957 and 1963, incorporating part of the old Mozhaiskoye Schosse (buildings no. 19 to 45) that was rebuilt in grand Stalinist style in the late 1930s on the site of the former Dorogomilovo Cemetery, and the low-rise neighborhoods of Kutuzovskaya Sloboda Street and Novodorogomilovskaya Street that were razed in the 1950s. Initially, Kutuzovsky Prospekt extended east to the Garden Ring; however, in 1963, at the beginning of the New Arbat redevelopment, the segment between the Garden Ring and Novoarbatsky Bridge was assigned to New Arbat (then known as Prospekt Kalinina). 

The eastern part of the Prospekt (within Dorogomilovo District), developed between 1938 and 1963, has been traditionally an expensive, high-quality residential area and hosted the social elite, including Leonid Brezhnev's family. The segment west of the Poklonnaya Hill is less affluent, with standardized 1950s–1980s housing; one notable exception is the luxury Edelweiss apartment tower built in the 2000s.

Notable buildings

Notable buildings and institutions include:
 2 - Hotel Ukraina
 26 - Apartment building that housed Leonid Brezhnev, Mikhail Suslov, and Yuri Andropov
 32 - Sberbank City 
 38 - Borodino Panorama museum
 The Poklonnaya Hill Arch on Victory Square
 Museum of Great Patriotic War and Victory Park (ru) (Парк Победы, Victory Park) on the site of the former Poklonnaya Hill.

See also
 Dorogomilovo District contains the eastern, affluent segment of Kutuzovsky Prospekt
 Kutuzovsky Prospekt is a glossy "lifestyle" magazine

External links
  official site of Dorogomilovo District

Streets in Moscow